Ilves FS is a futsal club based in Tampere, Finland, part of multi-sport club Ilves. Ilves plays in the Futsal-Liiga, the top-division in Finnish futsal. Ilves is the most successful club in Futsal-Liiga with eight championships (most recent in 2013-2014).

Honours 
Finnish Championship (8): 2004, 2005, 2007, 2010, 2011, 2012, 2013, 2014
Futsal Cup winner: 2006, 2010, 2011
Super Cup winner: 2004, 2006, 2007, 2010, 2011

UEFA Club Competitions Record

UEFA Futsal Cup

See also
Futsal in Finland

References

External links
Official website
UEFA profile

Futsal clubs in Finland
Sport in Tampere